John Howard Harris (April 24, 1847 – April 4, 1925) was president of Bucknell University from 1889 to 1919.

Biography
John Howard Harris was born in Indiana County, Pennsylvania on April 24, 1847.

Harris served in the American Civil War. He obtained a BA from the University at Lewisburg in 1869. In 1889, he was inaugurated as President of Bucknell University. He was president for 30 years.

He died at his home in Scranton, Pennsylvania on April 4, 1925.

References

External links
Harris, John Howard, Inaugural address as president of Bucknell University, Lewisburg, Pa: June 27, 1889: with salutary address by C.B. Ripley (1889)
Harris, John Howard, and Harris, Mary Belle, Thirty years as president of Bucknell: with baccalaureate and other addresses,  Press of W. F. Roberts Company (1926)

Presidents of Bucknell University
Bucknell University alumni
1847 births
1925 deaths